Mount End is a hamlet in the Epping Forest district, in the county of Essex, England.

Transport 
Mount End is near the M25 and M11 motorways. Nearby settlements include the town of Epping, the village of Theydon Mount, and the hamlets of Colliers Hatch and Fiddlers Hamlet. Mount End is on a Roman Road.

References 

Hamlets in Essex
Epping Forest District